David Robinson is a Jamaican reggae singer who first recorded in Jamaica in the late 1970s. He also recorded as Dave and The Diamonds such as "Chagga Chagga Warrior" (1978). His "Chant to Jah" was arranged and produced by Dennis Brown. In later years he moved to Milwaukee, Wisconsin.

Discography
A: I Bet You Dont Know B Skin, Flesh, And Bones Version Tit For Tat Records Jamaica 1975
A: Native Woman B: Dub Version Crystal Records Jamaica	1975
A: Jah Know The Rebels B: Gordon Road Rock Ja-Man Records Jamaica 1977
A: Moving Away B: Mozambique Bad Gong Records Jamaica 1977
A: Rain Bow B: Rain Style Bad Gong  	 1978
A: Pay The Price B: Version Bad Gong  	1978
Dave And The Diamonds A: Chagga Chagga Warrior B: Dub Version Love Records 1978
A: Cool Runnings B: Version 	 Bad Gong  	1978	 
A: Ruby And Diamonds Errol Holt B: Version  	1979
A: On The Rocks B: Rodigan Rock  1981	
A: Celebrate B: Celebration Jaguar Records Jamaica		1982
A: Black Man Dance [no artist listed] B: Version

References

American reggae musicians
Possibly living people
Year of birth missing
Musicians from Milwaukee